Gabriel Entertainment (part of Gabriel Group) is a video game developer based in Indianapolis, Indiana, USA, and was founded in 1999 as Gabriel Interactive by Michael Root (president). Greg Phillips is vice president. In addition to developing commercial business simulation games, the company has also developed educational games for the Children's Museum of Indianapolis.

Games

Through The Starburst Window → 2000
Robot Arena → 2001
Dr. Rottenbones & The Factory of Flab → 2001
X-Ray Imaging → 2002
Robot Arena 2: Design and Destroy → 2003
Construction-Destruction → 2003
John Deere: American Farmer → 2004
Super Stunt Spectacular → 2005
Caterpillar Construction Tycoon → 2005
John Deere: Busy Days in Deerfield Valley → 2005
John Deere: Welcome to Merriweather Farm → 2005
John Deere: North American Farmer → 2005
John Deere: American Builder Deluxe → 2006
John Deere: American Farmer Deluxe → 2006
Ride! Carnival Tycoon → 2007
Rock Tour → 2008
Robot Arena 3 → 2016

References

External links
 Gabriel Entertainment at 3D Gamers
 Gabriel Interactive at MobyGames
 Gabriel Entertainment at MobyGames

Video game development companies
Video game companies established in 1999
Video game companies of the United States
Companies based in Indianapolis
1999 establishments in Indiana